is a Japanese professional boxer. He is a three-division world champion and the former undisputed bantamweight world champion, having held the WBA (Super), IBF, Ring magazine titles between 2019 and January 2023, and the WBC and WBO titles between 2022 and January 2023. He previously held the WBA (Regular) bantamweight title from 2018 to 2019, the WBO junior-bantamweight title from 2014 to 2018, and the WBC light-flyweight title in 2014.

Nicknamed "The Monster", Inoue is known for his timing, speed, punching power, and body-punching ability, having a knockout ratio of 88%. As of August 2022, he is ranked as the world's best active boxer, pound for pound, by the Transnational Boxing Rankings Board (TBRB), second by The Ring, the Boxing Writers Association of America and ESPN, and seventh by BoxRec. He is also ranked as the best bantamweight by The Ring, TBRB, ESPN, and BoxRec. He is the only Japanese fighter in history to be ranked #1 pound for pound by The Ring.

Amateur career 
Inoue won the Japanese Interscholastic Athletic Meeting and the Japanese Junior National Championships in 2009. In 2010, he took the bronze medal in the Asian Youth Championships in Tehran, Iran, and won the Japanese Junior Selection Tournament. He then participated in the AIBA Youth World Championships, but lost to Yosvany Veitía in the third preliminary round. He finished in the second place at the Japanese National Championships in the same year.

In July 2011, he took the gold medal in the 21st President's Cup in Jakarta, Indonesia. He subsequently won the first place in the Japanese Interscholastic Athletic Meeting in that year. However, he was eliminated in the third round by Yosvany Veitía in the 2011 World Amateur Boxing Championships at the Heydar Aliyev Sports and Exhibition Complex in Baku, Azerbaijan, and lost to Birzhan Zhakypov in the final at the 2012 Asian Boxing Olympic Qualification Tournament in Astana, Kazakhstan. His amateur record was 75–6 (48 KOs and RSCs).

Highlights

 Asian Youth Championships (48 kg), Tehran, Iran, March 2010:
1/8: Defeated Bilguun Battulga (Mongolia) 11–2
1/4: Defeated Omirbek Kudaybergenov (Kazakhstan) RSC 3
1/2: Lost to Masoud Rigi (Iran) 1–7
AIBA Youth World Championships (48 kg), Baku, Azerbaijan, April 2010:
1/32: Defeated Kibrom Gebreegziabher (Ethiopia) KO 2
1/16: Defeated Laishram Devender Singh (India) 8–4
1/8: Lost to Yosvany Veitia (Cuba) 0–11
 President's Cup (49 kg), Jakarta, Indonesia, July 2011:
1/8: Defeated Muhb Mohibullah (Pakistan) RSC 3
1/4: Defeated Dylan Perkins (Australia) 20–5
1/2: Defeated Wu Rongguo (China) 21–19
Finals: Defeated Ian Clark Bautista (Philippines) 23–10

AIBA World Championships (49 kg), Baku, Azerbaijan, September–October 2011:
1/32: Defeated Denny Hitarihun (Indonesia) 16–7
1/16: Defeated Hovhannes Danielyan (Armenia) RSC 2
1/8: Lost to Yosvany Veitia (Cuba) 12–15
Asian Olympic Qualifier (49 kg), Astana, Kazakhstan, April 2012:
1/4: Defeated Asylbek Nazaraliyev (Kirghistan) RSC 2
1/2: Defeated Asror Vokhidov (Tajikistan) 21–16
Finals: Lost to Birzhan Zhakypov (Kazakhstan) 11–16

Professional career

Light flyweight

Early years 
Inoue turned professional in 2012, signing with Ohashi Boxing Gym. Of his own volition, he signed an agreement with Hideyuki Ohashi to never fight against easy opponents. On 2 October 2012, he fought against Filipino national champion Crison Omayao, and won his debut via a fourth-round knockout. After this victory, he won his next two fights against Thai national champion Ngaoprajan Chuwatana and Japan's number one-ranked light flyweight boxer Yūki Sano. On 25 August 2013, Inoue captured the Japanese light flyweight title from the WBA's number three-ranked contender, and future WBA, IBF, and Ring magazine light flyweight champion, Ryoichi Taguchi. This was seen as Inoue's toughest test thus far but in the end he dominated and battered Taguchi over ten rounds.

He then fought for the vacant OPBF light flyweight title on 6 December 2013 on the undercard of Yaegashi-Sosa. Inoue defeated Jerson Mancio with a 5th-round TKO to claim the regional title. Earlier that day, his younger brother, Takuma Inoue, made his professional debut with a unanimous decision victory.

Inoue vs. Hernández, Kokietgym 
Inoue stopped Adrián Hernández (29–2–1, 18 KOs) to be crowned the WBC light flyweight champion in his sixth professional bout at Ota-City General Gymnasium on 6 April 2014. Hernández was a two-division champion who had previously gone 8–1 in world title bouts, but Inoue dominated the fight from beginning to end. Inoue's sole defense of his light flyweight title came against Samartlek Kokietgym (17–5, 5 KOs) in September 2014. Inoue routed Kokietgym, winning every round on all scorecards and dropping his opponent twice before finally stopping him in the 11th round.

Super flyweight

Inoue vs. Narváez 
In November 2014, he vacated his light flyweight title in order to challenge WBO junior bantamweight title-holder Omar Andrés Narváez (43–1–2, 23 KOs), the fight was scheduled for 30 December 2014. His one loss had come by decision to Nonito Donaire in 2011. Narváez had won his first world championship in 2002, making twenty-seven title defenses of his belts since. Inoue arrived at the fight with a 7–0 record. However, the young challenger Inoue put Narváez down within a minute of the first round. He then proceeded to hurt Narváez over and over with carefully placed body shots. Inoue knocked out the long time champion in the second round to capture his second world title.

Various defenses 
Inoue suffered an injury with the punch that put Narvaéz down the first time. In response to Inoue being sidelined, the WBO issued an interim title bout between two of its top-ranked contenders, David Carmona and Warlito Parrenas. The winner would have the right face Inoue following his comeback. The fight was ruled a split draw after 12 rounds but Inoue chose to face Parrenas regardless in his comeback bout on 29 December 2015. Parrenas was blown out in a similar manner as Narváez. The referee waved off the fight in the second round, after Parrenas was dropped twice, giving Inoue a TKO victory.

Inoue would then face Carmona in May 2016, suffering another hand injury midway through the fight. Inoue would eventually win a comfortable unanimous decision (118-109, 118–109, 116–111). Nevertheless, Carmona was only the second fighter to go the distance with Inoue, after Ryoichi Taguchi. Inoue's third defense came against Petchbarngborn Kokietgym on September of that same year. Inoue was unable to get a quick finish, but he unleashed a flurry of punches in the 10th round which led to Kokietgym being counted out.

Inoue vs. Kono, Rodríguez 
On 9 November, it was announced that Inoue's fourth defense would come against Kohei Kono (32–10–1, 13 KOs) on 30 December 2016. Kono was a two-time junior bantamweight champion who had lost his WBA belt to Luis Concepción in his previous fight. Naoya's brother, Takuma, was slated to challenge for a world title against Marlon Tapales on the same night but he pulled out due to a fractured right hand. Inoue stopped Kono in another commanding performance. Kono was dropped once by a left hook from Inoue before being stopped in the sixth round. This was the first time Kono lost a fight due to stoppage.

During 2016, Inoue repeatedly sought a unification bout against four-division champion and WBC champion Román González. However, González chose to face Carlos Cuadras instead in the second half of the year. González stipulated that the terms offered for an Inoue fight weren't good enough, as Inoue was mostly unknown in North America.

Inoue's fifth defense of his WBO title came against Ricardo Rodríguez in May 2017. Rodríguez proved to be yet another outmatched opponent, as Inoue comfortably won by stopping him in the 3rd round following a flurry of punches.

Inoue vs. Nieves 
Following his easy win over Rodríguez, Inoue joined the HBO Boxing After Dark card "Superfly" set at the StubHub Center on 9 September 2017. The event was headlined by the González-Sor Rungvisai rematch for the WBC junior bantamweight title. It also featured a WBC eliminator between Carlos Cuadras and Juan Francisco Estrada, in addition to Inoue's debut in the US and first pro bout abroad. Originally, McJoe Arroyo was slated to be Inoue's challenger but Arroyo wound up fighting Rau'shee Warren in an IBF eliminator instead. Inoue's next fight would be against Antonio Nieves (17–2–2, 9 KOs) instead.

Inoue's sixth defense of his WBO title was successful, as he hammered Nieves, who threw in the towel after six rounds. Nieves was rocked towards the end of round 2, but Inoue was unable to finish him as he headed back to his corner when he mistook the 10-second warning with the bell. Inoue scored a knockdown in round 5 after a left hook to the body. Nieves retired after round 6, when Inoue repeatedly landed that left hook to the body to no response from Nieves. Inoue landed 118 of 407 punches (29%) to Nieves' 45 of 209 (22%).

Inoue vs. Boyeaux
Inoue stated that he would move to bantamweight in the future but he would seek to unify titles against another junior bantamweight titleholder in December 2017. Inoue's team later claimed that they were having trouble securing an opponent for the New Year's Eve date. They'd reportedly agreed to terms with IBF champion Jerwin Ancajas, but he would later announce he was fighting Jamie Conlan in November. Ancajas' manager had previously said that negotiations with Inoue had not taken place. On November 16, it was announced that Inoue would face Yan Boyeaux on 30 December, in a show televised by Fuji TV. Inoue said he planned to box in the United States again within 2 months after fighting Boyeaux. Inoue dropped Boyeaux four times before referee Raul Caiz Jr. eventually stepped in at 1 minute and 40 seconds of round 3, giving Inoue the win, successfully retaining the WBO title for the seventh time. Inoue stated that he had plans to move up to bantamweight, where he would seek to become a three-weight world champion.

Bantamweight

Inoue vs. McDonnell 
Promoter Eddie Hearn first reported to Sky Sports on 14 February 2018 that a deal was being negotiated for WBA 'Regular' bantamweight champion Jamie McDonnell (29–2–1 13 KOs) to defend his title, which he won in 2014, for the seventh time, against Inoue in Japan. McDonnell's original plan was to move up to super bantamweight in 2018, however instead stated he wanted big challenges and saw Inoue as a solid opponent to test himself. On 6 March, Inoue held a press conference in Japan announcing the fight against McDonnell at the Ota-City General Gymnasium in Tokyo, Japan on 25 May 2018. The fight started at a pace that McDonnell was unable to sustain initially being hurt with a left hook to the top of the head, followed by being sent to the canvas by a two punch combination culminating in a left hook to the body. He bravely got up, only to be sent back down after a series of brutal punches by Inoue including another clean left hook which seemed to discombobulate McDonnell's senses. The referee waved the fight off within less than a round declaring Inoue the TKO victor.

World Boxing Super Series 

After defeating McDonnell, Inoue said, "I'll participate in the World Boxing Super Series to face other world champions with pleasure," confirming he would take part in the bantamweight tournament, where he would meet other world champions, Ryan Burnett (19-0, 9 KOs), WBO champion Zolani Tete (27–3, 21 KOs) and IBF champion Emmanuel Rodríguez (18–0, 12 KOs).

Inoue vs. Payano 
At the draft gala on 20 July, Inoue (16–0, 14KOs) chose to defend his WBA title against Dominican Republic boxer Juan Carlo Payano (20–1, 9 KOs) in the quarter final. Payano was ranked #4 by the WBA and #7 by the WBC at bantamweight. In August, the fight was announced to take place on October 7 at the Yokohama Arena in Yokohama, Japan. Inoue won the fight with a first-round knockout. It was a right hand just 70 seconds into their scheduled 12-round bout. Inoue connected with a jab before blasting Payano with a perfect straight right hand that put Payano flat on his back and unable to continue. Referee Pinit Prayadsab immediately stopped the fight at 1:10 into the first round.

Inoue vs. Rodríguez 
Emmanuel Rodríguez (19–0, 12 KOs) defeated Jason Moloney via decision in October 2018, booking his place into the semi-final against Inoue. On 12 February 2019, the fight was set to take place at the SSE Hydro in Glasgow, Scotland on 18 May 2019. In April, Nonito Donaire defeated late replacement Stephon Young, to confirm his place in the final. Donaire stated he would 'love to fight' Inoue in the final, as the two have always respected each other. On 3 May, The Ring Magazine, announced their vacant bantamweight title would be at stake. At the time, WBO champion Zolani Tete, who was ranked #2 with The Ring, withdrew from the tournament with injury. Editor-in-Chief, Doug Fischer, explained with Inoue and Rodríguez ranked #1 and #3, respectively, the bout was worthy of being for the title, as both had earned their positions in the rankings. On 18 May, Inoue advanced to the final by knocking out Rodríguez in the second round. After a close first round, Inoue dropped Rodríguez three times in quick succession before the fight was stopped at 1:20.

Inoue vs. Donaire
Inoue faced four-weight world champion, Nonito Donaire (40–5, 26 KOs), on 7 November 2019, in Saitama, Japan, for the World Boxing Super Series final. In a thrilling fight that saw incredible heart and endurance displayed by both men, Inoue ultimately won a unanimous decision with scores of 116–111, 117–109 and 114–113. The two traded punches in the first half of the fight. In the second round, a left hook from Donaire caused a serious cut above Inoue's right eye which affected his vision, but he fought back hard and in the fifth round had Donaire in trouble, who was saved by the bell. However, Donaire retained his composure and began to hurt Inoue more in the second half of the fight, particularly in the ninth round where he landed a tremendous right hand and left Inoue's face bloodied. During the eleventh round, Inoue downed Donaire with a left hook to the liver, but he made it to his feet at a count of 9 and kept fighting until the final bell. After the fight, Donaire and Inoue showed each other mutual respect, with Inoue lauding Donaire as "a true champion". Inoue was presented the Muhammad Ali Trophy by Fighting Harada. Afterward, Inoue revealed he suffered a fractured orbital bone in the second round causing him to see double, and also a broken nose. The fight was later voted the Ring magazine Fight of the Year.

Inoue vs. Moloney 
Inoue was supposed to face WBO bantamweight titlist John Riel Casimero on 25 April 2020 before that fight was canceled because of the COVID-19 pandemic. Inoue instead faced Jason Moloney (21–1, 18 KOs) on 31 October at the MGM Grand Conference Center in Las Vegas. Moloney was ranked #6 by The Ring, #1 by the WBO, #2 by the WBA and #4 by the IBF. Inoue scored a seventh-round knockout victory. In the sixth round, a quick counter left hook sent Moloney down. In the seventh, a short right hand sent Moloney down for the second time. While he tried to get up, he did not have his senses, and referee Kenny Bayless stopped the fight at 2:59 of the round. During a post-fight interview with Inoue, he spoke about his wishes for future opponents: "The Nordine Oubaali-Nonito Donaire winner with the WBC title and Casimero with the WBO, they're within my sights are far as fights go."

Inoue vs. Dasmariñas 
Inoue faced his IBF mandatory challenger Michael Dasmariñas (30–2–1, 20 KOs) on 19 June 2021 in Paradise, Nevada. Dasmarinas was ranked #1 by the IBF and #8 by the WBA. He scored three knockdowns in the span of three rounds, each one with a left hook to the body of Dasmariñas, to win via third-round stoppage. After the fight, Inoue stated his desire to become the first undisputed champion in the bantamweight division, saying “Getting this win brings a smile to my face. The ability to face the winner of Donaire-Casimero brings an even bigger smile to my face.”

Inoue vs. Dipaen 
It was announced on 21 October 2021 that Inoue would be defending his bantamweight world titles in a voluntary defense against IBF #6 ranked contender Aran Dipaen (12–2, 11 KOs) on 14 December 2021, at the Ryōgoku Kokugikan in Tokyo. According to Inoue, his team first attempted to arrange bouts with Rau'shee Warren and Gary Antonio Russell, but were unable to do so due to Japan's strict coronavirus protocols which made bringing in foreign fighters difficult. Inoue's first domestic fight in over two years was broadcast by Hikari TV and Abema TV in Japan, but didn't receive any international coverage. Inoue entered the bout as a -3000 favorite to retain his titles. Inoue won the fight by an eight-round technical knockout. He knocked Dipaen down with a left hook in the eight round, and although Dipaen was able to beat the ten count, he was badly staggered by a second left hook as soon as the action resumed, which prompted referee Michiaki Someya to wave the fight off. Inoue earned a guaranteed purse of $500,000; $300,000 in show money and a $200,000 win bonus. His reported fight purse did not include sponsorship payments. Inoue was later named the 2021 "Fighter of the Year" by the Japanese Boxing Commission.

Inoue vs. Donaire II 
Inoue made his fourth title defense as a unified bantamweight champion in a title unification bout with the reigning WBC champion Nonito Donaire on 7 June 2022, at the Saitama Super Arena in Saitama, Japan. The fight was a rematch of their 7 November 2019 title unification bout, which Inoue won by unanimous decision. Inoue opened as the favorite, with most odds-makers having him as a -400 favorite to win the rematch. The bout was broadcast by Amazon Prime Video domestically in Japan, and by ESPN+ in the United States. Inoue won the fight by a second-round technical knockout. After knocking Donaire down at the very end of the first round, Inoue once again staggered him with a left hook near the start of the second round, before finishing him with a flurry of punches at the 1:24 minute mark of the round. He became Japan's first-ever three-belt titleholder in boxing history. Inoue expressed his desire to fight the WBO champion Paul Butler in his post-fight interview, stating: "My aim is to be the undisputed champion. But if I can't, I am capable of [moving up] and fighting for a belt". He was briefly ranked as the number one pound for pound boxer by The Ring after this victory, thus becoming the first Japanese boxer to reach that milestone.

Inoue vs. Butler 

On 25 August 2022, it was announced that Inoue would face the reigning WBO bantamweight champion Paul Butler in a title unification bout. It took place on 13 December 2022, at the Ariake Arena in Tokyo, Japan, and was broadcast by Amazon Prime domestically and by ESPN+ in the United States. It was Butler's first fight outside of the United Kingdom. Inoue won the fight by an eleventh-round technical knockout, as he stopped Butler with repeated body shots at the 1:09 minute mark of the round. He was up 100–90 on all three scorecards at the time of the stoppage and had outlanded Butler 151 to 38 in total punches, with 97 of those being power punches. Inoue announced his intention to move up to super bantamweight in the post-fight interview, stating: "I was able to make this goal of becoming undisputed world champion. Now, I'm considering going up to super bantamweight.” He became the first-ever Japanese boxer to claim undisputed championship status in the three- or four-belt era, as well as the first boxer in history to defeat all four major sanctioning organisation champions by knockout. Inoue vacated all five titles on January 13, 2023, as he moved up to super bantamweight.

Super bantamweight

Inoue vs. Fulton
On 18 January 2023, it was revealed that Inoue had entered into negotiations with the unified super bantamweight world champion Stephen Fulton. The fight is scheduled to take place at the Yokohama Arena in Yokohama, Japan on 7 May 2023, and will be broadcast by Lemino domestically and ESPN+ in the United States.

Professional boxing record

Exhibition boxing record

See also
List of world light-flyweight boxing champions
List of world super-flyweight boxing champions
List of world bantamweight boxing champions
List of undisputed world boxing champions
List of boxing triple champions
List of Japanese boxing world champions
Boxing in Japan

References

External links

NAOYA-INOUE.COM
Naoya Inoue - Profile, News Archive & Current Rankings at Box.Live

|-

|-

|-

|-

1993 births
Living people
Japanese male boxers
People from Zama, Kanagawa
Sportspeople from Kanagawa Prefecture
Light-flyweight boxers
Super-flyweight boxers
Bantamweight boxers
World light-flyweight boxing champions
World super-flyweight boxing champions
World bantamweight boxing champions
World Boxing Council champions
World Boxing Organization champions
World Boxing Association champions
International Boxing Federation champions
The Ring (magazine) champions